is a former Japanese professional footballer who plays as a centre back. He has represented the Japan national team internationally until 2019. He currently manager of second team and Technical Advisor of Top team Shinagawa CC.

Club career

Makino was born in Nishi-ku, Hiroshima. In January 2012, he returned to J. League, loaned by 1. FC Köln to Urawa Red Diamonds, where he was coached again by his former Sanfrecce's coach, Mihailo Petrović.

Makino announcement retirement from football in 2022 after last career with Vissel Kobe and 16 years from professional football.

International career
In July 2007, Makino was elected Japan U-20 national team for 2007 U-20 World Cup. At this tournament, he played 3 matches as center back and scored a goal in the match against Czech Republic.

Makino made his full international debut for Japan on 6 January 2010 in a 2011 Asian Cup qualification against Yemen. In May 2018 he was named in Japan's preliminary squad for the 2018 World Cup in Russia.

Career statistics

Club
.

International

Scores and results list Japan's goal tally first, score column indicates score after each Makino goal.

Honours
Sanfrecce Hiroshima
J. League Division 2: 2008
Japanese Super Cup: 2008

Urawa Red Diamonds
Emperor's Cup: 2018, 2021
J. League Cup: 2016
AFC Champions League: 2017
Suruga Bank Championship: 2017

Japan
EAFF East Asian Cup: 2013
Kirin Cup: 2009, 2011
AFC Asian Cup runner-up: 2019

Individual
J.League Best XI: 2010, 2015, 2016
J. League Fair Play Award: 2010

References

External links

Profile at Urawa Reds

1987 births
Living people
Association football people from Hiroshima Prefecture
Association football defenders
Japanese footballers
Japan youth international footballers
Japan international footballers
J1 League players
J2 League players
Bundesliga players
Sanfrecce Hiroshima players
1. FC Köln players
1. FC Köln II players
Urawa Red Diamonds players
Vissel Kobe players
Japanese expatriate footballers
Expatriate footballers in Germany
Japanese expatriate sportspeople in Germany
2018 FIFA World Cup players
2019 AFC Asian Cup players